is a Japanese illustrator and character designer. He is best known for designing and characterizing the cast members from the visual novel adventure games Danganronpa and the anime Akudama Drive.

Career

Komatsuzaki was a sculpture graduate before becoming involved with Spike, and Danganronpa was his first experience as a character designer. The word "Danganronpa" originated from Komatsuzaki which was first written in kanji but it was later taken to katakana for the logo.

For most games, he was in charge of designing characters with outstanding designs while the protagonist were meant to look like common people. As a result, Komatsuzaki designed Makoto Naegi character to wear a hoodie to complement his look, thinking the player was going to see his back a lot. After that, the artist added some character to his hair by adding an "antenna", and highlighted his "herbivore nature" by making him short. His coloring is subdued, but Komtatsuzaki used a color palette he enjoyed. He also redesigned the older cast members from the first Danganronpa for the anime sequel Danganronpa 3: The End of Hope's Peak High School to make them look more mature, and illustrated the characters for the spin-off novel series Zero, Kirigiri, and Togami.

Besides Danganronpa, Komatsuzaki was one of many artists to design characters for Fate/Grand Order, an RPG mobile game based on the Fate/stay night series. He designed both Edmond Dantès and Cleopatra. He was also the main artist for the anime series Akudama Drive from 2020. Cindy H. Yamauchi adapted Rui Komatsuzaki's original character designs for animation. He also created a collaboration illustration between Danganronpa and the anime Akudama Drive in late 2020.

Works

Video games

Anime

References

Japanese video game designers
Living people
Year of birth missing (living people)